Charles Sprigg (1889–1969) was an English professional footballer who played in the Football League for Birmingham. He played as an outside left.

Sprigg was born in Smethwick, which was then in Staffordshire. He played local football before joining Birmingham in November 1912. He made his debut in the Second Division on 28 December 1912, in a home game against Bradford which finished as a 1–1 draw. He played in the next four games, and then left the club, only to return in 1914 having spent the intervening period playing for Redditch Town. He played nine more games before the First World War put a stop to the Football League. In 1915 he enlisted in the Royal Field Artillery.

Sprigg died in Birmingham in 1969 at the age of 79.

Notes

References

1889 births
1969 deaths
Sportspeople from Smethwick
English footballers
Association football wingers
Birmingham City F.C. players
Bilston Town F.C. players
Redditch United F.C. players
Moor Green F.C. players
English Football League players
Date of birth missing
Date of death missing
British Army personnel of World War I
Royal Field Artillery soldiers